Ethiopia competed at the 2004 Summer Paralympics in Athens, Greece. After a 20 years hiatus the country has made a comeback to the event.

Sports

Athletics

Men's track

See also
Ethiopia at the Paralympics
Ethiopia at the 2004 Summer Olympics

References 

Nations at the 2004 Summer Paralympics
2004
Summer Paralympics